The 2012 Glava Tour of Norway was the second edition of the Glava Tour of Norway cycle race. It forms part of the 2012 UCI Europe Tour.

Teams

Stages

Classification Leadership

Top ten

Webpages

Tour of Norway
Tour of Norway
2012 in Norwegian sport